The 2012 Minor Counties Championship was the 108th Minor Counties Cricket Championship season. It was contested through two divisions: Eastern and Western. Cornwall became Minor County Champions for first time.

Standings
 Pld = Played, W = Wins, W1 = Win in match reduced to single innings, L = Losses, L1 = Loss in match reduced to single innings, T = Ties, D = Draws, D1 = Draw in match reduced to single innings, A = Abandonments, Bat = Batting points, Bowl = Bowling points, Ded = Deducted points, Pts = Points, Net RPW = Net runs per wicket (runs per wicket for less runs per wicket against).

Teams receive 16 points for a win, 4 for a draw, or 8 for the team batting last in a draw with the scores level. Teams also received 12 points for a win, 6 for a draw and 4 points for losing a match reduced to a single innings. Matches abandoned without any play award 8 points to each team. Bonus points (a maximum of 4 batting points and 4 bowling points) may be scored during the first 90 overs of each team's first innings.

Eastern Division

Western Division

Final

Averages

References

2012 in English cricket
2012
Domestic cricket competitions in 2011–12